Dani Deahl is a Chicago based EDM, & House music producer, DJ, journalist, and blogger. She was the producer of a Billboard charted song and ran the music blog DSquared from 2009–2015.

Early life
Born and raised in Chicago, Illinois, Deahl became a DJ and got her first few residencies while she was still attending high school. In 2006, Deahl became producer and co-host of Red Bar Radio, the first internet podcast to be syndicated on terrestrial radio. Since that time, she's expanded into music production, journalism, and blogging. Deahl started her writing career as a contributor for Urb and shortly thereafter became their House Section Editor. She has also contributed to Chinashop (Red Bull's magazine), Time Out, Mateo, BPM, Complex, and Vice. Deahl's blog, DSquared, started in 2009.

TEDx
In 2014, Deahl did a highly publicized TEDx talk titled "Women, STEM & EDM." Deahl spoke in regards to her role as a female in the electronic music industry, and the inequalities that exist. she has also stated in interviews that she is a women's rights activist.

SMYK (Show Me Your Kitties Tour)
Deahl's "Show Me Your Kitties" tour was a tour that consisted of 30 shows all promoted, ticked, and planned out by staff and assistants of the tour. Deahl had stated that because she was a female DJ, she was finding it difficult to get booked and promoted for shows. In response to that, she made an active effort to self sustain the tour, from creating a ticketing service that allowed customers to also donate to a nonprofit big cat rescue charity, to booking and promoting shows without promoters.

DJ Mag
As of 2016, Deahl had taken up a role as an editor for popular music magazine DJ Mag. She said in an interview that she had written pieces for the magazine and then eventually was offered a position.

Personal life
Deahl is married to DJ Fei Tang. They married on May 5, 2013.

References

External links

 

Living people
Record producers from Illinois
Women DJs
American DJs
Year of birth missing (living people)
American women record producers